Judge Seitz may refer to:

Collins J. Seitz (1914–1998), judge of the United States Court of Appeals for the Third Circuit
Patricia A. Seitz (born 1946), judge of the United States District Court for the Southern District of Florida